Acronicta centralis is a moth of the family Noctuidae. It is found in Armenia, Iran, Tajikistan and Mongolia.

References 

Acronicta
Moths of Asia
Moths described in 1874